Nages is a commune in the Tarn department in southern France.

Population

See also
Communes of the Tarn department

References

Communes of Tarn (department)